Asesinos, S.A. (Murderers, Inc.) is a 1957 Mexican comedy film directed by Adolfo Fernández Bustamante and starring Adalberto Martínez and Kitty de Hoyos with Wolf Ruvinskis, Luis Aldás, Sara Guasch, and Guillermo Orea.

Cast
Adalberto Martínez as Pancho Gómez / León Bravo (credited as "Resortes")
Kitty de Hoyos as Julieta / Sofía
Wolf Ruvinskis as Muñeco
Luis Aldás as Vaneck
Sara Guasch as La Suegra / La Jefa
Guillermo Orea as Doctor del Río
Francisco Muller as Doctor Flores
Salvador Lozano as Headwaiter
Arturo Castro as Police Official
Roberto Y. Palacios as Chino
Francisco Reiguera as Doctor del Campo
Felipe de Flores as Vaneck's Secretary
Héctor Mateos as Henchman
René Barrera as Henchman
Conchita Gentil Arcos as Gymnastics Professor (credited as Conchita G. Arcos)
Magda Donato as Gymnast
Lucha Moreno as Club Torero Singer (film debut)
Lisa Rossel as Imaginary Dancer (film debut) (credited as Liza Rossell)
Ricardo Adalid as Bowler (uncredited)
Octávio Arias as Bowler (uncredited)
Guillermo Hernández as Doctor Flores' Assistant (uncredited)

Production
Filming began in December 1956 in Estudios Tepeyac.

Premiere
The film premiered on September 16, 1957, in Cine Orfeón for two weeks.

References

External links

Mexican comedy films
1950s Spanish-language films
1950s Mexican films